Weather Underground was an American radical left political organization. Weather Underground may also refer to:

Media and entertainment

Film
The Weather Underground (film), a 2002 documentary film about the group

Music
Weather Underground (album), an album by the rock band Geneva
Heligoland  (album), an album by the trip-hop group Massive Attack that had the working title Weather Underground

Television
Weather Underground, an American weeknight show that airs on evenings on The Weather Channel

Weather service
Weather Underground (weather service), a San Francisco, California-based commercial weather forecasting service

See also
Weatherman